Bethany is an unincorporated community and census-designated place in Washington County, Oregon, United States. It is situated north of U.S. Route 26 and Oak Hills, near Beaverton, approximately four miles northwest of Cedar Mill, and is within the Portland metropolitan area.

History
The name Bethany was first applied to a crossroads trading center about two miles northeast of the current location, where a Presbyterian church stands today. The area was first settled by Ulrich Gerber, who came from Switzerland in the mid-1870s. Gerber helped establish the first post office in the area in 1878, about a mile east of the current Bethany School, and suggested the name Bethany. "Bethany" is a Hebrew word, originally applied to a place in Palestine near Jerusalem, and used as a place name all over the United States, especially in connection with a church. The post office was discontinued in 1904.
The area's first public library was opened in July 2007 by a non-profit organization named the Cedar Mill Community Library Association, which has operated a library in nearby Cedar Mill since 1976.  It is considered a branch of that library and is named the Cedar Mill Community Library @ Bethany.

Demographics

2010 Census 
As of the census of 2010, there were 20,646 people, 7,205 households, and 5,579 families residing in Bethany. The racial makeup of Bethany was 60.4% White, 31.7% Asian, 1.7% Black, 0.2% Pacific Islander, 1.5% from other races, and 4.1% from two or more races. Hispanic or Latino of any race were 5.1% of the population.

There were 5,579 family households, of which 50.6% had children under the age of 18 living with them, 66.4% were married couples living together, 8.4% had a female householder with no husband present, 2.6% had a male householder with no wife present, and 22.6% were non-families. 18.6% of all households were made up of individuals, and 6.6% had someone living alone who was 65 years of age or older. The average household size was 2.86 and the average family size was 3.30.

The median age in Bethany was 35.7 years. The gender makeup of the area was 48.5% male and 51.5% female.

References

External links
 Historic images of Bethany from Salem Public Library
 Cedar Mill Community Library – Bethany Branch
 Historic images of the Bethany area from Washington County Heritage Online

Unincorporated communities in Washington County, Oregon
Unincorporated communities in Oregon
Portland metropolitan area
1878 establishments in Oregon
Populated places established in 1878
Census-designated places in Washington County, Oregon